Fifi, Fev & Nick is an Australian breakfast radio show on 101.9 The Fox in Melbourne, Victoria, Australia. It is hosted by Fifi Box, Brendan Fevola and Nick Cody with anchor Josiah Shala. The show began on 20 January 2014 replacing The Matt & Jo Show.

The show airs from 6am to 9am on weekday mornings with music and daily topic discussions and special guests.

A daily podcast featuring the best bits from each show is available on iTunes as is the podcast for all Hit Network breakfast shows in Australia.

News, sport, weather and traffic updates are presented by James Lake.

History
The show was founded in January 2014 replacing The Matt & Jo Show with Matt Tilley and Jo Stanley. Prior to joining the breakfast show Fifi Box was host of Fifi and Jules with Jules Lund. Dave Thornton previously filled in for Matt Tilley when he was sick and hosted Mamamia Today with Em Rusciano, and anchor Dan Anstey moved from rival station Nova 100 to Fox FM to anchor the show.

Kylie Minogue was the first guest on the show.

In December 2015, Southern Cross Austereo announced that Dan Anstey would leave the show, he was replaced by Sea FM's Byron Cooke.

In April 2016, Brendan Fevola joined the show as host and the show renamed to Fifi, Dave & Fev.

In January 2017, anchor Byron Cooke was added included within the show title and it was renamed to Fifi, Dave, Fev & Byron. In September 2017, Dave Thornton announced his resignation from Fox FM.

In June 2019, Southern Cross Austereo announced that Yvie Jones would fill in for Fifi Box whilst she is on maternity leave. Box returned from maternity leave on 16 September 2019.

In November 2020, Cooke had announced his departure from the show on air due to personal reasons and to also seek new challenges. Cooke's replacement was announced as comedian Nick Cody. Fifi, Fev & Nick commenced from 18 January 2021.   

In February 2021, Josiah Shala joined the show as anchor.

References

External links
 Fifi, Fev & Nick

Australian radio programs
2010s Australian radio programs
2020s Australian radio programs